Desmatractum is a genus of green algae, in the order Chlamydomonadales.

References

External links

Chlamydomonadales genera
Chlamydomonadales